The Muhammad Ali Boxing Reform Act, commonly referred to as the Ali Act, is a federal law that was introduced in 1999 and enacted on May 26, 2000 by the 106th Congress to: (1) protect the rights and welfare of boxers; (2) aid state boxing commissions with the oversight of boxing; and (3) increase sportsmanship and integrity within the boxing industry (See 114 Stat. 321(3)(2000)). The Act amends the 1996 Professional Boxing Safety Act by expanding upon legislation against exploitation, conflict of interest, enforcement, as well as additional amendments. The Act was enacted in response to widespread abuse of boxers by means of exploitation, rigged rankings, and rigged matches. 

The United States Congress noted through research that there were a number of problems with the sport of boxing which needed to be changed to ensure the safety and protection of professional boxers. Listed are a number of discoveries made by Congress (see 144 Stat. 322(3) (2000)):

Professional boxing is not governed by any league, association, or any form of  an established organization like majority of other professional sports.
The state officials are not ensuring the protection of the boxers and are not aware or informed of contracts boxers have agreed to. 
Promoters are taking advantage of the sport by conducting dishonest business affairs. Promoters are not being punished due to some states being less strict about the legal terms that are stated in contracts.
There is no rating system provided to rank professional boxers thus ratings are subjected to manipulation by those in charge.
There has been a major interference in the sport because of open competition by restrictive and anti-competitive bodies.
There are no restrictions placed on contracts that boxers agree to with promoters and managers. It is necessary to enforce a national contract reform which will guarantee the safety of professional boxers and the public from unlawful contracts and to enhance the integrity of the sport.

The Act received several criticisms. One criticism was that the Act provides rules but leaves the enforcement of these rules to the state without defined guidelines. Other criticism stems from the belief that Congress has no purpose regulating the boxing industry, especially if it does not regulate any other sport. 

In May 2016, a bill was introduced to Congress by Markwayne Mullin who was a politician and former mixed martial artist, to extend the Ali Act to mixed martial arts.

References

External links
 Text of the Act

 
Boxing in the United States
Acts of the 106th United States Congress
2000 in boxing
Sports law